INS Karanj (S23) is the third submarine of the first batch of six s for the Indian Navy. The submarine was launched on 31 January 2018, delivered to Indian Navy on 15 February 2021, commissioned on 10 March 2021 in Mumbai in presence of Chief of Naval Staff Admiral Karambir Singh and Admiral (Retired) VS Shekhawat.

The submarine inherits its name from INS Karanj (S21) which served in the Navy from 1969 to 2003, and was named after Karanja island, also known as Uran island, located in the Raigad district of Maharashtra.

See also
List of submarines of the Indian Navy
List of active Indian Navy ships

References

Attack submarines
2018 ships
Ships built in India
Kalvari-class submarines
Submarines of the Indian Navy